"For altid" is a song by Danish singer Medina from her third studio album For altid. It was released as the lead single from the album on 30 May 2011. "For altid" peaked at number one in Denmark, becoming Medina's sixth number-one single.

Track listing
 Danish digital download
 "For Altid" – 3:32
 Danish iTunes digital download EP
 "For Altid" (Svenstrup & Vendelboe Remix Club Edit) – 7:06
 "For Altid" (Svenstrup & Vendelboe Remix Radio Edit) – 3:20

Charts

Weekly charts

Year-end charts

Certifications

Release history

References

External links
 

2011 singles
Dance-pop songs
Synth-pop ballads
Medina (singer) songs
Number-one singles in Denmark
Songs written by Jeppe Federspiel
Songs written by Rasmus Stabell
2011 songs
Songs written by Medina (singer)